Ségolène Berger (born 25 March 1978) is a former professional tennis player from France.

Biography
Born in Nancy, Berger was a right-handed player who had a double handed backhand.

Berger had a best singles ranking of 180 in the world, with her biggest title win a $25,000 ITF tournament in Getxo in 1997, beating Anna Smashnova in the final.

At the 1998 French Open she received a wildcard into the main draw and lost in the first round to Barbara Rittner.

Retiring in 2005, she continues to play tennis on the ITF senior circuit and was early coach of French tennis player Harmony Tan.

ITF finals

Singles: 8 (1–7)

Doubles: 3 (1-2)

References

External links
 
 

1978 births
Living people
French female tennis players
Sportspeople from Nancy, France